Shaw Hall is a historic dormitory located on the campus of West Liberty University at West Liberty, Ohio County, West Virginia. It was built in 1919–1920, and is a three-story red brick building in the Classical Revival style. The front and end facades are dominated by two-story porticos with Ionic order columns having a stucco shaft.  It was built as the first dormitory on campus and housed female students.  It is the oldest building on the campus of West Liberty University.  The building now houses classrooms and administrative offices.  The building is named for John C. Shaw, president of West Liberty Normal School from 1908 to 1919.

It was listed on the National Register of Historic Places in 1996.

References

See also
 University and college buildings listed on the National Register of Historic Places

Residential buildings completed in 1920
Buildings and structures in Ohio County, West Virginia
Neoclassical architecture in West Virginia
Residential buildings on the National Register of Historic Places in West Virginia
West Liberty University
University and college buildings on the National Register of Historic Places in West Virginia
National Register of Historic Places in Ohio County, West Virginia